Outcast of Black Mesa is a 1950 American Western film directed by Ray Nazarro, and starring Charles Starrett, Smiley Burnette, Martha Hyer, Richard Bailey, and Stanley Andrews. The film was released by Columbia Pictures on April 13, 1950.

Plot

Cast
Charles Starrett as Steve Norman / Durango Kid
Smiley Burnette as Smiley
Martha Hyer as Ruth Dorn
Richard Bailey as Andrew Vaning
Stanley Andrews as Sheriff Grasset
William Haade as Dayton
Lane Chandler as Ted Thorp
William Gould as Walt Dorn
Robert J. Wilke as Curt - Henchman
Chuck Roberson as Kramer - Henchman
Ozie Waters as Ozie

References

External links

1950 Western (genre) films
American Western (genre) films
1950 films
American black-and-white films
Columbia Pictures films
1950s English-language films
Films directed by Ray Nazarro
1950s American films